Sailing/Yachting is an Olympic sport starting from the Games of the 1st Olympiad (1896 Olympics in Athens, Greece). With the exception of 1904 and the canceled 1916 Summer Olympics, sailing has always been included on the Olympic schedule.
The Sailing program of 1912 consisted of a total of four sailing classes (disciplines). For each class two races were scheduled from 19 July 1912 to 22 July 1912 off the coast of Nynäshamn at the Baltic Sea.

Venue 

When Sweden was assigned to host the 1912 Olympic Games two cities wanted to be the venue for the sailing program. Gothenburg and Stockholm.
Gothenburg claimed that it was a much shorter passage for the oversees entries (about ) than it was to Stockholm. Stockholm however got the sailing program because of then all Olympic events should be in the same vicinity.

The Royal Swedish Yacht Club was requested to organize the sailing event. Discussions took place whether the races would take place at the same time period of the other Olympic events. Finally the decision was taken to hold them just after the other Olympic events. Also several other races were organized in conjunction of the Olympic races.

Course area 
A inner and an outer course was created of the coast of Nynäshamn:

Competition

Overview 

A maximum of 2 boats per country per class was allowed.

Continents

Countries 
Source:

Classes (equipment) 
Source:
Although one of the oldest organized sporting activities, sailing in the early first part of the 20th century was not uniformly organized. This had a lot to do with national traditions as well as with the fact that there were no standardized boat types with uniform building instructions and measurements. Also a lot of development was done in the area of boat design and boat building. The shape of a boat, specifically its length, its weight and its sail area, are major parameters that determine the boat's speed. Several initiatives were started to create a formula that made it possible to have boats race each other without having to calculate the final result. But the different countries initially could not agree on an international system. At the Olympics of 1900 it was clear that sailing was not ready for international competition, and something had to be done.

In 1906 international meetings were organize to solve the problem.  Finally in Paris, October 1907 the first International Rule was ratified. Delegates from this meeting went on to form the International Yacht Racing Union (IYRU), the precursor to the present International Sailing Federation (ISAF).

The agreed formula gives a result in meters (Metre). During the meeting in 1907 the IOC made the decision to open the 1908 Summer Olympics for the following Metre classes:

Race schedule

Medal summary 
Source:

Medal tables 

The official report used a points system to rank participating nations in the sport:

Other information 
 This Olympic sailing event was gender independent, but turned out to be a Men-only event.
 6 Metre owner Dan Broström became Swedish Naval Minister from 1914 to 1917.
 The 12 Metre Heatherbell was the first 12-Metre built in the UK under the new First International Rule. She was designed by Thomas Glen-Coats, and built by Alexander Robertson & Sons, Sandbank Scotland, in 1907.
 The Swedish 8 Metre K.S.S.S. is often referred to as the lottery boat. Obvious this boat was built from lottery funds.

Sailors 
During the sailing regattas at the 1912 Summer Olympics among others the following persons were competing in the various classes:
 , Johan Anker, Multiple Olympic competitor and designer of many Metre yachts as well as the 1948 Olympic Dragon, in the 12 Metre
 , Dan Broström, Swedish Naval Minister from 1914 to 1917

Further reading

References 

 
1912 Summer Olympics events
1912
1912 in sailing
1912
Sport in Nynäshamn